Plodopitomnik is a rural locality (a selo) in Dmitriyevskoye Rural Settlement of Koshekhablsky District, Adygea, Russia. The population was 90 as of 2018. There is 1 street.

Geography 
Plodopitomnik is located 14 km northwest of Koshekhabl (the district's administrative centre) by road. Novoalexeyevsky is the nearest rural locality.

References 

Rural localities in Koshekhablsky District